Equitable Life may refer to:

 The Equitable Life Assurance Society, a life insurance company in the United Kingdom
 Equitable Holdings formerly AXA Equitable Life Insurance Company and The Equitable Life Assurance Society of the United States

See also 
 Equitable Life Building (disambiguation)